The 2014 Kurume Best Amenity Cup is a professional tennis tournament played on outdoor grass courts. It is the tenth edition of the tournament and part of the 2014 ITF Women's Circuit, offering a total of $50,000 in prize money. It takes place in Kurume, Fukuoka, Japan, on 12–18 May 2014.

Singles main draw entrants

Seeds 

 1 Rankings as of 5 May 2014

Other entrants 
The following players received wildcards into the singles main draw:
  Miyu Kato
  Yumi Miyazaki
  Yumi Nakano
  Chihiro Nunome

The following players received entry from the qualifying draw:
  Tori Kinard
  Mai Minokoshi
  Chiaki Okadaue
  Tamarine Tanasugarn

Champions

Singles 

  Wang Qiang def.  Eri Hozumi, 6–3, 6–1

Doubles 

  Jarmila Gajdošová /  Arina Rodionova def.  Junri Namigata /  Akiko Yonemura, 6–4, 6–2

External links 
 2014 Kurume Best Amenity Cup at ITFtennis.com
 Official website 

2014 ITF Women's Circuit
2014
2014 in Japanese tennis
May 2014 sports events in Asia